Frank Rothwell (born 16 June 1936) is an Irish weightlifter. He won eight All Ireland Weightlifting championships between 1963 and 1972. He competed in the men's middle heavyweight event at the 1972 Summer Olympics.

References

1936 births
Living people
Irish male weightlifters
Olympic weightlifters of Ireland
Weightlifters at the 1972 Summer Olympics
People from Clonmel